The Tiscali Short Film Award is a major short film award, sponsored by Tiscali and presented at the Raindance Film Festival each year since 2005 to the "best UK short under 10 minutes by a debut filmmaker".

Films which have won, or been nominated for, the award have gone on to achieve other notable successes, including a BAFTA Award, two BAFTA Award nominations, a Golden Palm nomination at the Cannes Film Festival, an Audience Award at the Kraków Film Festival, a Merit Award at the Arizona International Film Festival, a Best Newcomer Award at the Rushes Soho Shorts Festival, a BBC Three New Filmmakers Award nomination and a Best Short Film nomination at the Rushes Soho Shorts Festival.

2007

2006

2005

References 

British film awards
Short film awards